Pervasive may refer to:

Pervasive Computing, human computer interaction paradigm
Pervasive Informatics, study of how information affects human interactions 
Pervasive Software, software company in the United States
Pervasive PSQL, software developed by the company
Pervasive games, games that blend with the physical world
Pervasive developmental disorder, group of disorders characterized by delayed development of basic body functions

See also
Pervasiveness (disambiguation)